Flutter is an open-source UI software development kit created by Google. It is used to develop cross-platform applications for Android, iOS, Linux, macOS, Windows, Google Fuchsia, and the web from a single codebase.

First described in 2015, Flutter was released in May 2017.

History

The first version of Flutter was known as "Sky" and ran on the Android operating system. It was unveiled at the 2015 Dart developer summit with the stated intent of being able to render consistently at 120 frames per second. During the keynote of Google Developer Days in Shanghai in September 2018, Google announced Flutter Release Preview 2, the last major release before Flutter 1.0. On December 4th of that year, Flutter 1.0 was released at the Flutter Live event, denoting the first stable version of the framework. On December 11, 2019, Flutter 1.12 was released at the Flutter Interactive event.

On May 6, 2020, the Dart software development kit (SDK) version 2.8 and Flutter 1.17.0 were released, adding support for the Metal API which improves performance on iOS devices by approximately 50%, as well as new Material widgets and network tracking development tools.

On March 3, 2021, Google released Flutter 2 during an online Flutter Engage event. This major update brought official support for web-based applications with a new Canvas Kit renderer and web specific widgets, early-access desktop application support for Windows, macOS, and Linux and improved Add-to-App APIs. This release also utilized Dart 2.0 that featured sound null-safety, which caused many breaking changes and issues with many external packages; however, the Flutter team included instructions and tools to mitigate these issues.

On September 8th, 2021, Dart 2.14 and Flutter 2.5 were released by Google. The update brought improvements to the Android full-screen mode and the latest version of Google's Material Design called Material You. Dart received two new updates, standardizing lint conditions and marking support for Apple Silicon as stable.

On May 12, 2022, Google announced the release of Flutter 3 and Dart 2.17. This update expanded the total number of platforms supported to six, including stable support for Linux and macOS on both Intel and Apple Silicon processors. 

On August 30, 2022, Flutter 3.3 was announced. This release featured Objective-C and Swift interop and an early preview of a new rendering engine called "Impeller" which aims to reduce stutter caused by shader compilation.

On January 25, 2023, Flutter 3.7 was announced.

Framework architecture 
The major components of Flutter include:
 Dart platform
 Flutter engine
 Foundation library
 Design-specific widgets
 Flutter Development Tools (DevTools)

Dart language 
Flutter apps are written in the Dart language and make use of many of the language's more advanced features.

While writing and debugging an application, Flutter runs in the Dart virtual machine, which features a just-in-time execution engine. This allows for fast compilation times as well as "hot reload", with which modifications to source files can be injected into a running application. Flutter extends this further with support for stateful hot reload, where in most cases changes to source code are reflected immediately in the running app without requiring a restart or any loss of state.

For better performance, release versions of Flutter apps on all platforms use ahead-of-time (AOT) compilation, except for on the Web where code is transpiled to JavaScript.

Flutter inherits Dart's Pub package manager and software repository, which allows users to publish and use custom packages as well as Flutter-specific plugins.

Flutter engine 
Flutter's engine, written primarily in C++, provides low-level rendering support using either Google's Skia graphics library or the custom "Impeller" graphics layer. Additionally, it interfaces with platform-specific SDKs such as those provided by Android and iOS to implement accessibility, file and network I/O, native plugin support, and more.

Foundation library 
The Foundation library, written in Dart, provides basic classes and functions that are used to construct applications using Flutter, such as APIs to communicate with the engine.

Design-specific widgets 
The Flutter framework contains two sets of widgets that conform to specific design languages: Material Design widgets implement Google's design language of the same name, and Cupertino widgets implement Apple's iOS Human interface guidelines. Flutter allows the developer to use either set of widgets on either platform, i.e. even Cupertino widgets on Android. Third party packages can be used to automatically adjust the app's design to the current operating system.

IDE support 
Flutter maintains official support for the following IDEs and editors via plugins:
 IntelliJ IDEA
 Android Studio
 Visual Studio Code
 Emacs
Other IDEs can be used with community-supported plugins, or by using Flutter tools from the command line. There are several tools emerging in the market that have started to utilize official Flutter   IDE Framework and offer customized Graphical use interface builders.

Widgets 
The basic component in a Flutter program is a "widget", which can in turn consist of other widgets. A widget describes the logic, interaction, and design of a UI element with an implementation similar to React. Unlike other cross-platform toolkits such as React Native and Xamarin which draw widgets using native platform components, Flutter renders widgets itself on a per-pixel basis.

There are two fundamental types of widgets: stateless and stateful. Stateless widgets only update if their inputs change, making them very efficient, while stateful widgets can call the setState() method to update an internal state and redraw.

Although widgets are the primary method of constructing Flutter applications, they can also be bypassed in favor of directly drawing on a canvas. This feature has been occasionally used to implement game engines in Flutter.

See also
 Apache Cordova
 Titanium SDK
 Codename One
 Mobile development framework
 NativeScript
 GTK
 React Native
 Xamarin

References

External links 
 

2017 software
Google software
Programming tools
Proprietary software
Software frameworks